is a Japanese light novel series by Hinowa Kōzuki. Kōzuki first released the light novel in 2003, and concluded it in 2009 within 10 volumes (and a later side-story collection in 2013). An anime television series adaptation by Shin-Ei Animation aired from July to December 2017.

Plot
High school freshman Yūshi Inaba is forced to look for new place to live after his high school's dormitory burnt down. Having no parents and wanting to live independently from his uncle, he eventually finds a cheap apartment for 25,000 yen called Kotobuki-sō, only to find out that the place has human and supernatural creatures such as ghosts, yōkai, and mononoke living together. There, Yūshi's new daily life begins.

Characters

Yūshi is a high school freshman who lost his parents in a car accident three years prior to the story, and has been living with his uncle and his family who don't seem to want him. Having determination to live independently, Yūshi chooses JTB, a school with a dormitory. But the school's dormitory burned down and forced him to search for a temporary place to live for 6 months, where he found Kotobuki-sō. After living there, Yūshi gains the ability to heal others by absorbing their injuries. He seems to look like a family together with Hase and Kuri. This sometimes gives off some homoromantic vibes.

Yushi's childhood best friend and classmate. Hase comes from a rich family and is quite smart and cunning, his deviousness is often used for comic relief. He is well liked by the residents of the apartment as he often brings them many gifts, he likewise respects the many adults found there as proper examples of maturity rather than people who suck up to him because of his status. He is very fond of Kuri to the point he is referred to as his "Daddy" by the residents which in turn causes them to call Yushi the "Mommy" much to his dismay.
 

Akine is an easy-going resident in room 204, she goes to Takinodai High School and works as an exorcist at night in a hospital. "Akine Kuga" is the name she uses as a psychic. 

A resident at room 102, Reimei is a famous poet and fairytale writer. Nobody knows his real name and despite being a male, he refers to himself as "Atashi", a more feminine form of "Watashi".

A resident in room 103. Akira is a painter who owns a dog named Cigar.

A resident in room 203, although it seems he has another home, Ryū is a psychic with considerable power. He is respected both by the spiritual creatures in the apartment and human alike.

 Yushi's first friend in high school and member of the same club he is in.

A new teacher in Yushi's school who is on his 30s. He is usually laid back, carefree and easygoing. While it looks like he is being irresponsible, in truth he trusts the students and often lets small matters go unpunished or allow late students to come in, which results him in being quite popular especially amongst troublemakers. He will, however get angry and scold the alumni when needed and will go as far as putting on a front of strict behavior in order to coerce students to behave better, well aware that he may be misunderstood. He is well liked by Yushi's class, especially him and Tashiro, the latter having a crush on him.

A new teacher in Yushi's school. A woman of elegance and refined mannerisms, it is said by The Fool that she has an imperturbable aura, very much like Ryu has although she does not seem to be a psychic. Although she has good intentions at heart her overprotective, one-sided view of things leads her to assume things above the students based on sheer prejudice like believing Yushi was suffering and in need of affection due to his family situation, despite the fact he is moving onwards with his life with the residents of the apartment, or believing Yamamoto was bullied by the English Club for leaving crying for a fight she started. This in turn leads many students very angry without her knowledge, but decide to simply go with the flow as they know trying to convince her will be pointless. Yushi notes that when compared to Ryu's strict but present kindness, Aoki's is uncalled and irresponsible.

A student at Yushi's school who recently joined the English Club. She is quite short, bespectacled and has very long black hair. Konatsu has deep emotional problems and a severe inferiority complex with her older sister, given Konatsu was often sick this had led her to believe she was overprotected and given a different treatment in comparison to her academically and socially excelling sister. This in turn has made her to thrive to excel by any means possible in order to show her independence, showing off her intelligence whenever she can and trying to look smarter than she actually is. This has made her socially ostracized, very difficult to interact with and emotionally unstable as she will often try to belittle others while burst in tears when called out for her behavior.
 

Kuri and Shiro are a pair of a child and dog ghosts who always seen together. Kuri is a young toddler who was killed by his own mother when she was driven crazy by the fact that her boyfriend had left her (due to her pregnancy), and Shiro is a stray dog who wanted to take care of Kuri. A running gag is that Hase is referred to as his "Daddy" while Yushi is by proxy his "Mommy" by the residents.

Media

Light novel
Hinowa Kōzuki first published the series in 2003 through Kodansha's YA!ENTERTAINMENT. It concluded in 2013 with a total of 10 volumes and 1 side stories compilation volume. Kadokawa Bunko later republished the series in 2008 until 2014 with renewed art.

Manga
A manga adaptation by Waka Miyama was serialized in Kodansha's shōnen manga magazine Monthly Shōnen Sirius from May 26, 2011, to August 26, 2021. Kodansha collected its chapters in twenty-four tankōbon volumes, released from November 9, 2011, to January 7, 2022.

Kodansha USA are publishing the manga in English in a digital format. 

A spin-off manga, titled , began serialization in the same magazine on December 24, 2021. The first volume was published on July 7, 2022. It is titled number 25 as a sequel series.

Volume list

Elegant Yokai Apartment Life: Peru Arc

Anime
The anime adaptation was first announced via the May issue of Kodansha's Monthly Shōnen Sirius on March 18, 2017. Mitsuo Hashimoto directed the anime at Shin-Ei Animation with series composition by Yasunori Yamada. Tomomi Shimazaki designed the characters for animation. The anime aired from July 3 to December 25, 2017, on Tokyo MX, Yomiuri TV, and BS11's Anime no Me programming block. It ran for two cours. Lozareena performed the first opening theme song titled "Good Night Mare" while Atsushi Abe and Yūichi Nakamura performed the ending theme song . The second opening theme is performed by Wi-Fi-5, while Lozareena performed the second ending theme, "Neiro".
 Crunchyroll holds the right for the stream.

Notes

References

External links
Official website 

2017 anime television series debuts
2003 Japanese novels
Kodansha manga
Light novels
Shin-Ei Animation
Shōnen manga
Supernatural anime and manga
Tokyo MX original programming
Yōkai in anime and manga
Yomiuri Telecasting Corporation original programming